Governor Hutchinson's Field is a nature reserve located in Milton, Massachusetts.  The field is owned by The Trustees of Reservations.  The property is the only means of public access to another Trustees property, the otherwise inaccessible Pierce Reservation.

History 
In 1734, Thomas Hutchinson, last civilian royal governor of Massachusetts, built a country estate on the property. The two remaining parts of the estate are the field, which affords sweeping views of Boston and Quincy and a ha-ha which is now on the property of St. Michael's Episcopal Church, a block away from the field.  (A ha-ha is a sunken wall which permits unblocked views, while still serving functions of a wall such as delineating a border and preventing livestock from crossing.)

The field was an orchard during Hutchinson's time, but became open land during the 19th century.  The Trustees of Reservations acquired the field in 1898, and it is open to the public for passive recreational purposes.  The adjacent Pierce Reservation land was given to the Trustees in 1957.

Getting there
The field, with its view of Boston, is on Adams Street at the top of Milton Hill, opposite the Capt. Robert B. Forbes House and the Dr. Amos Holbrook House, both of which are also on the National Register of Historic Places.  The field is a contributing property to the Milton Hill Historic District.

References

External links
Governor Hutchinson's Field The Trustees of Reservations
Pierce Reservation The Trustees of Reservations

The Trustees of Reservations
Protected areas of Norfolk County, Massachusetts
Open space reserves of Massachusetts
1898 establishments in Massachusetts
Protected areas established in 1898
Historic district contributing properties in Massachusetts